Cold Response is the name given to Norwegian led military exercises with NATO member countries and invited Partnership for Peace countries held in Norway every second year.

Cold Response 2006
The first exercises was the largest military exercise in Norway in 2006. Around 10,000 soldiers from 11 nations participated.

Operations
Several of the operations were along the coast in the borders between sea and land, and together with roads and populated areas. Surveillance, patrols, road control posts, vehicle inspection, control of air space, minesweeping, evacuation of civilians, and riot control were important part of the exercise.

Participants 
Among the participants were the Norwegian Telemark Battalion, a thousand soldiers from the Norwegian Home Guard, the Royal Norwegian Air Force's 339 Squadron and 720 Squadron, and most of the Royal Norwegian Navy's available forces. About 3,000 soldiers from the British 3 Commando Brigade, completed their annual winter training by taking part in the exercise. 800 French mountain special forces, and 2,000 Swedish soldiers along with smaller units from the Netherlands, Latvia, Estonia, Switzerland, USA, Finland, Spain, Denmark and Canada also took part.

Scenario 
After an earthquake in the fictional country of Asando, an armed conflict by extremists and separation-groups against government forces erupts. The security council approves a resolution to allow NATO to take control of the situation. A peacekeeping force was assigned to help settle the conflict.

The 2007 exercise

The 2009 exercise
16-25 March.

The 2010 exercise
17 February through 4 March, with up to 9,000 troops from 14 participating nations.

The 2012 exercise
12–21 March, with over 16,000 troops from 15 participating nations.

The 2014 exercise
7–22 March, with over 16,000 troops from 16 participating nations.

The 2016 exercise
29 February through 11 March, with over 15,000 troops from 12 participating nations.

The 2020 exercise - cancelled during exercise
2-18 March, with some 16,000 troops from 10 participation nations.

Stopped and canceled on 11 March due to the risk of increase spreading of COVID-19.

The 2021 exercise - cancelled before exercise
The exercise that was cancelled in January 2021 due to the COVID-19 pandemic.

The 2022 exercise
The exercise is scheduled for March and April 2022 and will be led by the Norwegian Joint Headquarters. The first allied troops arrived in Norway in the autumn and winter 2021–22 to train and prepare for the exercise.

The military activity will mainly take place in south-eastern Norway, central Norway and the northern parts of the country. As of March 2022, a total of 27 nations and approximately 30,000 troops are signed up for the exercise. According to a Norwegian Joint Headquarters spokesman, this is 5,000 fewer troops than expected due to the concurrent Russian invasion of Ukraine.

Accidents

Leopard 2 through the ice
Two Norwegian soldiers from the Telemark Battalion died when a Leopard 2 tank went through the ice in 2006

C-130 Hercules accident

A Royal Norwegian Air Force C-130 Hercules crashed during the exercise in the north of Sweden on 15 March 2012 where all five on board were killed.

MV-22B Osprey accident
A United States Marine Corps MV-22B Osprey aircraft crashed in Beiarn during the exercise on 18 March 2022. All 4 crew members were killed.

References

NATO military exercises
Military of Norway